Tacchinardi is an Italian surname. Notable people with the surname include:

Alessio Tacchinardi (born 1975), Italian footballer and manager
Fanny Tacchinardi Persiani (1812–1867), Italian opera singer
Massimiliano Tacchinardi (born 1971), Italian footballer
Nicola Tacchinardi (1772–1859), Italian opera singer

Italian-language surnames